is a former Japanese professional baseball pitcher. He was born on September 21, 1984. He is currently playing for the Saitama Seibu Lions of the NPB.

References

1984 births
Living people
Baseball people from Tokushima Prefecture
Japanese baseball players
Nippon Professional Baseball pitchers
Chiba Lotte Marines players
Saitama Seibu Lions players